Legacy Tower may refer to:

 Legacy at Millennium Park, Chicago
 Legacy Tower (Purbachal, Dhaka), Bangladesh
 Legacy Tower (Rochester, New York)
 Legacy Tower at Miami Worldcenter, Miami, Florida 
 The Tower at Mutual Plaza, formerly Legacy Tower, in Durham, North Carolina